Decius was a 3rd-century Roman emperor.

Decius may also refer to:

Decia gens for several other Ancient Romans
Decius (consul 529), Flavius Decius (fl. 529-546), politician of the Eastern Roman Empire
Decius (Exarch), first Exarch of Ravenna 584–585
Decius Wadsworth (1768-1821), Colonel in the Ordnance Corps of the United States Army who, in 1817, created Wadsworth's cipher
Filippo Decio (1454–1535), Italian jurist
Nikolaus Decius (c.1485–1541), German minister and hymn writer
Tom Cross (computer security), American technology expert who works under the pseudonym Decius, from Decius Wadsworth
 A misspelling of Decimus Junius Brutus Albinus as "Decius Brutus" in William Shakespeare's Julius Caesar